Giusto Fernando Tenducci, sometimes called "il Senesino" (c. 1735 – 25 January 1790), was a soprano (castrato) opera singer and composer, who passed his career partly in Italy but chiefly in Britain.

Biography
Born in Siena in about 1735, Tenducci became a castrato, and he was trained at the Naples Conservatory. Castration was illegal in both Church and civil law, but the Roman Church employed castrati  in many churches and in the Vatican until about 1902; and throughout the 17th and 18th centuries the public paid large sums of money to listen to the spectacular voices of castrati in the opera houses.

In 1753, when he was about seventeen, Tenducci made his professional opera appearance in Venice, as Gasparo in Ferdinando Bertoni's Ginevra.

In 1757 and 1758 he was active at the Teatro di San Carlo in Naples.

From 1758 he was in London, where he was first heard at the King's Theatre. He sang an aria by the castrato Caffarelli in Baldassare Galuppi's Attalo. and the following year he was singing in Gioacchino Cocchi's Ciro riconosciuto. He was still singing as "second man" but Charles Burney thought he was the best. He spent eight months in a debtors prison, but by 1764 he was back at the King's Theatre where he befriended Johann Christian Bach and he sang the title role in his new opera Adriano in Siria, opposite Giovanni Manzuoli as  the 'primo uomo' (leading male singer).

He then sang in Ireland. He was not only singing but also arranging operas for the Smock Alley Theatre. In 1765 in Dublin he met Dorothea Maunsell, whom he married in 1766. In 1768 he returned to London from Edinburgh, where he remained for almost the rest of his life. He taught singing to Wolfgang Amadeus Mozart in Paris in 1777–1778. Impressed with his teacher's singing abilities, Mozart wrote a concert aria for him which is now lost (K. 315b).

He returned to Italy just months before his death in January 1790 in Genoa.

Marriage: 1766–1772

Although a castrato, Tenducci married 15-year-old Dorothea Maunsell secretly in 1766. The marriage was repeated in July 1767 with a license granted by the Bishop of Waterford and Lismore. In 1772, those marriages was later annulled on the grounds of non-consummation or impotence, which was one of the few grounds that women could use to sue for divorce. However,  Giacomo Casanova claimed in his autobiography that Dorothea gave birth to two children. His subsequent biographer Helen Berry was unable to corroborate this claim and suggests that they may have been the children of Dorothea's second husband, Robert Long Kingsman.

Two portraits of Tenducci were painted by Thomas Gainsborough – one is now in the Barber Institute of Fine Arts in the University of Birmingham, the other was sold from the collection of Yves Saint Laurent.

Appearance in literature
In 1766, Tenducci sang the part of Arbaces in Arne's opera Artaxerxes in Dublin, delighting the public by 'his exquisite singing of the air "Water parted from the Sea" '. A group known as the "frolicsome Dublin boys" sang a song about him: "Tenducci was a piper's son/ and he was in love when he was young,/ and all the tunes that he could play/ was Water parted from the say."  James Joyce quoted and parodied that song in Finnegans Wake, II.3.

Tenducci is mentioned in Robert Fergusson’s poem "The Canongate Playhouse in Ruins"; while in Edinburgh, Tenducci sang three songs with lyrics by Fergusson.

Further reading:
 Helen Berry: The Castrato and His Wife, Oxford, Oxford University Press, 2011
 Dora Tenducci, A true and genuine narrative of Mr. and Mrs. Tenducci In a letter to a friend at Bath. Giving a full account, from their marriage in Ireland, to the present time, London, printed for J. Pridden, 1768
 Patrick Barbier: The World of the Castrati, London, Souvenir Press, 1996
 Angus Heriot, The Castrati in opera, London, Secker and Warburg, 1956
 Franz Habock, Die Kastraten und ihre Gesangkunst, Stuttgart/Leipzig/Berlin, Deutsche Verl.-Anstalt, 1927

References

External links
 

1730s births
1790 deaths
Year of birth uncertain
18th-century composers
18th-century Italian male musicians
18th-century Italian composers
Italian male composers
Castrati
Italian opera singers
People from Siena